Noor Muhammad Khan is a Jatiya Party (Ershad) politician and the former Member of Parliament of Tangail-6.

Career
Khan was elected to parliament from Tangail-6 as a Bangladesh Nationalist Party candidate in 1979.

Khan was elected to parliament from Tangail-6 as a Jatiya Party candidate in 1986 and 1988.

References

Jatiya Party politicians
Living people
2nd Jatiya Sangsad members
3rd Jatiya Sangsad members
4th Jatiya Sangsad members
Year of birth missing (living people)